Connor Anderson (born 13 May 1996) is an Australian rugby union player who plays for the  in Super Rugby. His playing position is flanker. He was named in the Reds squad for the 2023 Super Rugby Pacific season. He previously represented  in the 2019 National Rugby Championship.

Anderson was born in Brisbane and represents Wests in the Queensland Premier Rugby. On the tour, he made his Queensland debut against Saitama Wild Knights. He signed for the Reds for two seasons in November 2022.

Reference list

External links
itsrugby.co.uk profile

Australian rugby union players
Living people
1996 births
Rugby union flankers
Brisbane City (rugby union) players
Queensland Reds players
Rugby union players from Brisbane